The men's long jump event at the 1955 Pan American Games was held at the Estadio Universitario in Mexico City on 14 March.

Medalists

Results

Qualification

Final

References

Athletics at the 1955 Pan American Games
1955